Lakeview Heights may refer to:

 Lakeview Heights, British Columbia, Canada
 Lakeview Heights, Kentucky, United States